Condon USFS Airport  is a public use airport located one nautical mile (1.85 km) northwest of the central business district of Condon, in Missoula County, Montana, United States. It is owned by the United States Forest Service (USFS).

Facilities and aircraft 
It has one runway designated 13/31 with a turf surface measuring 2,575 by 135 feet (785 x 41 m). For the 12-month period ending July 21, 2008, the airport had 1,000 aircraft operations, an average of 83 per month: 80% general aviation and 20% air taxi.

References

External links 
 

Airports in Montana
Buildings and structures in Missoula County, Montana
United States Forest Service
Transportation in Missoula County, Montana